Elaeocarpus montanus  is a species of flowering plant in the Elaeocarpaceae family used as a medicinal plant. It is endemic to Sri Lanka. It is known as "Gal weralu - ගල් වෙරලු" by Sinhalese people.

References

External links
jstor.org

montanus
Endemic flora of Sri Lanka